Sergei Vladimirovich Gusev (born July 31, 1975) is a Russian former professional ice hockey defenceman. He played in the National Hockey League (NHL) with the Dallas Stars, while enjoying a lengthy career in his native Russia in the Kontinental Hockey League (KHL). Gusev was drafted 69th overall by the Stars in the 1995 NHL Entry Draft.

Playing career

Gusev played four seasons in the National Hockey League, with the Dallas Stars and the Tampa Bay Lightning, where he scored 4 goals and 10 assists for 14 points in 89 games, and had up 34 penalty minutes.

In 2001, Gusev returned to Russia to play for Severstal Cherepovets before joining SKA Saint Petersburg. He played 25 professional seasons before ending his career with HC Yugra of the KHL at the conclusion of the 2016–17 season.

Career statistics

Regular season and playoffs

International

References

External links

1975 births
Living people
Avangard Omsk players
Avtomobilist Yekaterinburg players
Dallas Stars draft picks
Dallas Stars players
Detroit Vipers players
HC CSK VVS Samara players
Kalamazoo Wings (1974–2000) players
People from Nizhny Tagil
Russian ice hockey defencemen
Severstal Cherepovets players
SKA Saint Petersburg players
Tampa Bay Lightning players
HC Yugra players
Sportspeople from Sverdlovsk Oblast